Cuba competed at the 1900 Summer Olympics in Paris, France.

Medalists

Fencing

Cuba had one fencer compete in the nation's debut.  He won the amateur épée competition, and in a special event that pitted the top four amateurs in 1900 against the top four professionals, he defeated all but one of his opponents, finishing 6-1 to take the silver medal.

References

Nations at the 1900 Summer Olympics
1900
Olympics